The Shields Branch (French: Rivière Saint-Roch in Quebec) is a tributary of the Big Black River), flowing in:
 Quebec (Canada): in the administrative region of Chaudière-Appalaches, in L'Islet Regional County Municipality, in the municipalities of Sainte-Perpétue, Chaudière-Appalaches, Quebec, Saint-Omer, Quebec and Saint-Pamphile, Quebec;
 Maine (United States): in the Aroostook County, Township T15 R15 Wels.

Its course is situated between the Rochu River (or “Little Saint Rock River”) (West side) and the Gagnon River (West side). This river is especially flowing in forest area in a valley encircled by Notre Dame Mountains.

From its source, in L'Islet Regional County Municipality, the river runs south and southeast across the Canada–United States border in Maine Township 15, Range 15, WELS, to the Big Black River in T 14, R 15.

Geography 
The upper part of the "Saint Roch River" begins in Notre Dame Mountains, in the municipality of Sainte-Perpétue, Chaudière-Appalaches, Quebec in the L'Islet Regional County Municipality (RCM). This source is located at:
  Northwest of the border between Quebec and Maine;
  Northeast from the village of Sainte-Perpétue, Chaudière-Appalaches, Quebec;
  Northwest from the confluence of the Saint-Roch River;
  Southeast of the village center of Saint-Jean-Port-Joli, Quebec.

St. Roch river flows on  according to the following segments:

From the source in the mountains, the Saint-Roch river flows:
 to the South in Sainte-Perpétue, Chaudière-Appalaches, Quebec, cutting the path of range Taché East, up to the boundary of the municipality of Saint-Omer;
 to the South in Saint-Omer, up to the boundary of the municipality of Sainte-Perpétue, Chaudière-Appalaches, Quebec ;
 to the South in Sainte-Perpétue, Chaudière-Appalaches, Quebec, up to the confluence of the Saint-Roch Nord River (from the West) ;
 to the Southeast, up to the boundary of the municipality of Saint-Pamphile, Quebec;
 to the Southeast, up to the confluence of the Gagnon River (Saint Roch River) (from the Southwest);
 to the Southeast, up to the border between Quebec and Maine.

Lower course of the river (segment  in Maine designated "Shields Branch")

From the border between Quebec and Maine, the "Shields Branch" runs on:
 to the Southeast in the Maine, up to the "Little Saint-Roch River" (from the Northeast). Note: This river takes its source in Quebec where it is designated Rochu River;

The "Shields Branch" flows into a river curve on the North bank of the Big Black River, Township T14 R15 Wels, in the Aroostook County. This confluence is located:
 Southeast of the border between Canada and U.S.
 West of the confluence of the Big Black River
 Southeast of the village center of Saint-Pamphile, in Quebec

Toponymy

The place name "Saint-Roch River" was formalized on December 5, 1968, at the Commission de toponymie du Québec (Quebec Places Names Board.

Bibliography

See also
 Little Saint Roch River, a stream
 List of rivers of Quebec
 List of rivers of Maine

References

Maine Streamflow Data from the USGS
Maine Watershed Data From Environmental Protection Agency

External links 

  Maine Streamflow USGS data
  Maine Watershed data from the Environmental Protection Agency

Rivers of Chaudière-Appalaches
Tributaries of the Saint John River (Bay of Fundy)
Rivers of Aroostook County, Maine
North Maine Woods
International rivers of North America